In taxonomy, the Methanocorpusculaceae are a family of microbes within the order Methanomicrobiales. It contains exactly one genus, Methanocorpusculum.  The species within Methanocorpusculum were first isolated from anaerobic digesters and anaerobic wastewater treatment plants.  In the wild, they prefer freshwater environments. Unlike many other methanogenic archaea, they do not require high temperatures or extreme salt concentrations to live and grow.

Nomenclature

The name Methanocorpusculaceae has Latin roots. Overall, it means family of bodies that produce methane.

Description and metabolism
The cells within this species are coccoid, small and irregular.  They are Gram-negatives and not very motile.  They reduce carbon dioxide to methane using hydrogen, but they can also use formate and secondary alcohols. They cannot use acetate or methylamines.  They grow most quickly at 30–40 °C.

Phylogeny
The currently accepted taxonomy is based on the List of Prokaryotic names with Standing in Nomenclature (LPSN) and National Center for Biotechnology Information (NCBI).

See also
 List of Archaea genera

References

Further reading

Scientific journals

Scientific books

Scientific databases

External links 

Archaea taxonomic families
Euryarchaeota